Misfit may refer to:

Film, books, and television
 "Misfit" (short story), a 1939 short story by Robert A. Heinlein
 The Misfit, a character in Flannery O'Connor's short story "A Good Man Is Hard to Find"
 Misfit (1965 film), a 1965 American film
 The Misfit (TV series), a 1970s ATV sitcom series
 Salah Asuhan (film), a 1972 Indonesian film released internationally as The Misfit
 Misfit (2017 film), a 2017 Dutch film

Music
 Misfit (songwriter), Korean lyricist at S.M. Entertainment
 "Misfit" (Amy Studt song), 2003
"Misfit" (Curiosity Killed the Cat song), 1986
 "Misfit" song by Elefant from Sunlight Makes Me Paranoid
 "Misfit", 1980 song by Wipers from their album Is This Real?
 Misfit, a rapper in the hip hop group Rascalz

Other uses
 Misfit (DC Comics), comic book character
 Misfit (Marvel Comics), comic book character
 Misfit Studios, a Canadian small press publishing company
 Misfit Wearables, a wearable sensor technology design and manufacturing company

See also
 Misfit (comics), a list of comics that share the name
 Misfits (disambiguation)